The 2023–24 season will be the 114th season of competitive football in Germany.

National teams

Germany national football team

Kits

UEFA Euro 2024

UEFA Euro 2024 Group A

UEFA Euro 2024 fixtures and results

Germany women's national football team

Kits

2023 FIFA Women's World Cup

2023 FIFA Women's World Cup Group H

2023 FIFA Women's World Cup fixtures and results

2023–24 UEFA Women's Nations League

2023–24 UEFA Women's Nations League A

2023–24 UEFA Women's Nations League fixtures and results

UEFA Women's Euro 2025 qualifying

League season

Men

Bundesliga

Bundesliga standings

2. Bundesliga

3. Liga

3. Liga standings

Women

Frauen-Bundesliga

Frauen-Bundesliga standings

2. Frauen-Bundesliga

Cup competitions

Men

DFB-Pokal

DFL-Supercup

Women

DFB-Pokal Frauen

German clubs in Europe

UEFA Champions League

Group stage

UEFA Europa League

Group stage

UEFA Europa Conference League

Qualifying phase and play-off round

Play-off round

UEFA Women's Champions League

Qualifying rounds

Round 1

Round 2

Group stage

References

 
Seasons in German football